Dmitri Nikolayevich Vakulich (born 25 April 1990) is a former Russian professional football player.

Club career
He made his Russian Football National League debut for FC Fakel Voronezh on 2 May 2012 in a game against FC Chernomorets Novorossiysk.

External links
 
 

1990 births
Sportspeople from Samara, Russia
Living people
Russian footballers
Association football forwards
FC Fakel Voronezh players
FC Petrotrest players
FC Khimki players
FC Lada-Tolyatti players
FC Tolyatti players